Montgomery Run is a  long 2nd order tributary to Anderson Creek in Clearfield County, Pennsylvania.

Course 
Montgomery Run rises about 2 miles northeast of Rockton, Pennsylvania, and then flows generally southwest to join Anderson Creek about 5 miles south-southwest of Anderson Creek.

Watershed 
Montgomery Run drains  of area, receives about 45.8 in/year of precipitation, has a wetness index of 446.10, and is about 93% forested.

See also 
 List of Pennsylvania Rivers

References

Watershed Maps 

Rivers of Pennsylvania
Rivers of Clearfield County, Pennsylvania